The following is a list of notable individuals interred or inurned at Hollywood Forever Cemetery in Los Angeles, California, in the United States.

A

 David Abel (1883–1973), cinematographer (aged 90)
 Joseph Achron (1886–1943), musician (aged 56)
 Bert Adams (1891–1940), MLB player (aged 49)
 Don Adams (1923–2005), actor, Agent Maxwell Smart on TV's Get Smart (aged 82)
 Louis Adlon (1908–1947), actor (aged 39)
 Renée Adorée (1898–1933), actress (aged 35)
 Gilbert Adrian (1903–1959), MGM costume designer (aged 56)
 Helen Ainsworth (1902–1961), actress/producer (aged 59)
 Spottiswoode Aitken (1868–1933), actor (aged 64)
 Albert Akst (1899–1958), film editor (aged 57)
 Norman Alden (1924–2012), actor (aged 87)
 Erville Alderson (1882–1957), actor (aged 74)
 Frank Alexander (1879–1937), actor (aged 58)
 J. Grubb Alexander (1887–1932), screenwriter (aged 44)
 Charlie Allen (1942–1990), singer (aged 48)
 Lester Allen (1891–1949), actor (aged 57)
 Kirstie Alley (1951-2022), actress, television personality (aged 71)                                                                                                                                                       
 Murray Alper (1904–1984), actor (aged 80)
 Albert Edward Anson (1879–1936), actor (aged 56)
 Andrew Arbuckle (1887–1939), actor (aged 51)
 Gus Arnheim (1897–1955), composer (aged 58)
 Sylvia Ashley (1904–1977), actress/socialite (aged 73)
 Gertrude Astor (1887–1977), actress (aged 90)
 David Avadon (1948–2009), magician and illusionist (aged 60)
 Charles Avery (1873–1926), actor (aged 53)
 Agnes Ayres (1892–1940), actress (aged 48)

B

 Leah Baird (1883–1971), actress/screenwriter (aged 88)
 Charles Graham Baker (1883–1950), screenwriter/director (aged 66)
 Reginald Baker (1884–1953), actor/athlete/stuntman (aged 69)
 Fred J. Balshofer (1877–1969), director/producer (aged 91)
 Peter Bardens (1945–2002), musician, founding member of the progressive rock band Camel (aged 57)
 George Barnes (1892–1953), cinematographer  (aged 60)
 James O. Barrows (1855–1925), actor (aged 70)
 Anne Bauchens (1882–1967), film editor (aged 85)
 Frank Beal (1862–1934), actor/director/screenwriter (aged 72)
 James H. Beatty (1836–1927), federal judge in Idaho (aged 91)
 William Beaudine (1892–1970), director and actor (aged 78)
 Tony Beckley (1929–1980), actor (aged 50)
 Charles Belcher (1872–1943), actor (aged 71)
 Monta Bell (1891–1958), director (aged 66)
 Ted Bennett (1872–1941), actor (aged 69)
 Clara Beranger (1886–1956), screenwriter (aged 70)
 Elmer Berger (1891–1952), inventor of the rear-view mirror (aged 61)
 Harry Bernard (1878–1940), actor/comedian (aged 62)
 Vic Berton (1896–1951), musician (aged 55)
 Herman Bing (1889–1947), actor (aged 57)
 Maurice Black (1891–1938), actor (aged 47)
 Paula Blackton (1881–1930), actress/director (aged 48)
 Richard Blackwell (1922–2008), fashion critic (aged 86)
 Mel Blanc (1908–1989), actor, comedian, and voice-over artist of Looney Tunes and Hanna-Barbera cartoons; his tombstone has his famous epitaph, "That's all folks" (aged 81)
 Lucille Bliss (1916–2012), actress/voice artist (aged 96)
 Lilian Bond (1908–1991), actress (aged 83)
 Gypsy Boots (1914–2004), fitness guru (aged 89)
 Egon Brecher (1880–1946), actor/director (aged 66)
 Joseph Carl Breil (1870–1926), singer/composer/director (aged 55)
 El Brendel (1890–1964), actor/comedian (aged 74)
 Felix Bressart (1892–1949), actor (aged 57)
 Jack Brooks (1912–1971), composer (aged 59)
 Coral Browne (1913–1991), actress (aged 77)
 Edward Bunker (1933–2005), actor/screenwriter/novelist (aged 71)

C

 Louis Calhern (1895–1956), actor (aged 61)
 Edwin Carewe (1883–1940), actor/director/producer/screenwriter (aged 56)
 Horace B. Carpenter (1875–1945), actor (aged 70)
 Lynn Cartwright (1927–2004), actress, wife of Leo Gordon (aged 77)
 Joseph Cawthorn (1868–1949), actor (aged 80)
 Harry Chandler (1864–1944) publisher of the Los Angeles Times and investor (aged 80)
 Charles Chaplin Jr. (1925–1968), actor, son of Charlie Chaplin (aged 42)
 Hannah Chaplin (1865–1928), actress, mother of Charlie Chaplin (aged 63)
 Emile Chautard (1864–1934), actor/director/screenwriter (aged 69)
 Al Christie (1881–1951), director/producer and screenwriter (aged 69)
 Charles Christie (1880–1955), movie studio owner (aged 75)
 Gertrude Claire (1852–1928), actress (aged 75)
 William Andrews Clark, Jr. (1877–1934), founder of the Los Angeles Philharmonic (aged 57)
 Lana Clarkson (1962–2003), actress/model (aged 40)
 Dark Cloud (1855–1918), actor and model (aged 62)
 Iron Eyes Cody (1904–1999), actor (aged 94)
 Art Cohn (1909–1958), screenwriter (aged 48)
 Harry Cohn (1891–1958), co-founder of Columbia Pictures (aged 66)
 Jack Cohn (1889-1956), co-founder of Columbia Pictures (aged 67)
 Robert Cohn (1920–1996), motion picture producer (aged 75)
 Cornelius Cole (1822–1924), California Congressional Representative and U.S. Senator (aged 102)
 Thomas F. Cooke (1863–1941), Los Angeles City Council member, (1929–1931) (aged 78)
 Lillian Kemble-Cooper (1892–1977), actress and singer, wife of actor Guy Bates Post (aged 85)
 Lois Collier (1922–1999), actress (aged 80)
 Pierre Collings (1902–1937), screenwriter (aged 35)
 Edward Connelly (1859–1928), actor (aged 68)
 Morty Corb (1917–1996), jazz musician (aged 78)
 Chris Cornell (1964–2017), musician, lead singer of the bands Soundgarden, Audioslave, and Temple of the Dog (aged 52)
 Norman Cousins (1915–1990), author and editor (aged 75)
 William H. Crane (1845–1928), actor (aged 82)
 Henry Cronjager (1877–1967), cinematographer, Father of Edward Cronjager (aged 90)
 Alan Crosland (1894–1936), director (aged 41)
 James Cruze (1884–1942), actor/director (aged 58)
 Irving Cummings (1888–1959), film director and actor (aged 70)
 Kevin Curran (1957–2016), television writer (aged 59)

D

 Orlando da Costa (1929–2006), Portuguese Minister (aged 77)
 Dick Dale (1937–2019), American Guitarist and pioneer of surf music (aged 81)
 Cass Daley (1915–1975), actress/comedian/singer (aged 59)
 Viola Dana (1897–1987), actress (aged 90)
 Karl Dane (1886–1934), actor (aged 47)
 Bebe Daniels (1901–1972), actress (aged 70)
 Joe Dassin (1938–1980), American-born French singer/songwriter (aged 41)
 Marion Davies (1897–1961), actress (aged 64)
 Reine Davies (1883–1938), actress (aged 51)
 Rosemary Davies (1903–1963), actress (aged 60)
 J. Gunnis Davis (1873–1937) English actor and director (aged 63)
 Harry J. Davenport (1858–1929), actor (aged 71)
 Milla Davenport (1871–1936), actress (aged 65)
 William De Vaull (1871–1945), actor (aged 74)
 Doris Deane (1901–1974), actress (aged 73)
 Ashton Dearholt (1894–1942), actor (aged 48)
 Harry Delmar (1892–1984), producer/director (aged 91)
 Cecil B. DeMille (1881–1959), director/producer (aged 77)
 Constance Adams DeMille (1874–1960), actress, wife of Cecil B. DeMille (aged 86)
 William C. DeMille (1878–1955), director/writer (aged 76)
 Barry Dennen (1938–2017), actor (aged 79)
 George Spiro Dibie (1931–2022), cinematographer (aged 90)
 Basil Dickey (1880–1958), screenwriter (aged 77)
 Gloria Dickson (1917–1945), actress (aged 27)
 John Frances Dillon (1884–1934), actor/director (aged 49)
 Andreas Dippel (1866–1932), opera singer (aged 65)
 Molly Dodd (1921–1981), actress (aged 59)
 Frances Drake (1912–2000), actress (aged 87)
 Larry Drake (1949–2016), actor (aged 67)
 Jesse Duffy (1894–1952), screenwriter (aged 58)
 Bobby Dunn (1890–1937), actor/comedian (aged 46)
 Richard Dunn (1936–2010), actor (aged 73)
 Elmer Dyer (1892–1970), cinematographer (aged 78)

E
 B. Reeves Eason (1886–1956), actor/director/screenwriter (aged 69)
 B. Reeves Eason, Jr. (1914–1921), actor (aged 6)
 Maude Eburne (1875–1960), actress (aged 85)
 Nelson Eddy (1901–1967), actor/singer (aged 65)
 Robert Edeson (1868–1931), actor (aged 62)
 Walker Edmiston (1925–2007), actor/voice actor (aged 82)
 Lillian Elliott (1874–1959), actress (aged 84)
 Louise Emmons (1861–1935), actress (aged 74)
 Billy Engle (1889–1966), actor (aged 77)
 Skinnay Ennis (1907–1963), musician (aged 56)
 Fred Esmelton (1872–1933), actor (aged 61)
 Douglas Evans (1904–1968), actor (aged 64)
 Charles Eyton (1871–1941), former general manager of Paramount Pictures (aged 70)

F

 Max Fabian (1891–1969), cinematographer (aged 78)
 Douglas Fairbanks (1883–1939), actor (aged 56)
 Douglas Fairbanks, Jr. (1909–2000), actor (aged 90)
 Mabel Fairbanks (1915–2001), figure skater (aged 85)
 Marion Fairfax (1875–1970), screenwriter (aged 94)
 Daniel L. Fapp (1904–1986), cinematographer (aged 82)
 Timothy Farrell (1922–1989), actor (aged 66)
 Julia Faye (1893–1966), actress (aged 73)
 Maude Fealy (1883–1971), actress (aged 88)
 Charles K. Feldman (1904–1968), agent/film producer (aged 64)
 Hugo Felix (1866–1934), composer (aged 68)
 Mark Fenton (1866–1925), actor (aged 58)
 Perry Ferguson (1901–1963), art director (aged 62)
 Flora Finch (1869–1940), actress (aged 71)
 Peter Finch (1916–1977), actor (aged 60)
 Abem Finkel (1889–1948), screenwriter (aged 58)
 Victor Fleming (1889–1949), director (aged 59)
 Edna Flugrath (1893–1966), actress (aged 73)
 John Taintor Foote (1881–1950), writer (aged 68)
 John Foreman (1925–1992), film producer (aged 67)
 Kim Fowley (1939–2015), singer/actor/songwriter/music producer/publisher (aged 75)
 Charles Robert Francis (1875–1946), recipient of the United States Marine Corps Medal of Honor
 Sidney Franklin (1893–1972), director (aged 79)
 Kathleen Freeman (1919–2001), actress (aged 82)
 Otto Fries (1887–1938), actor (aged 50)
 Joe Frisco (1889–1958), actor/comedian (aged 69)
 George Froeschel (1891–1979), screenwriter (aged 88)
 Leo Fuchs (1911–1994), actor (aged 83)

G

 Victor A. Gangelin (1899–1967), set designer (aged 68)
 Ed Gardner (1901–1963), actor/comedian (aged 62)
 Judy Garland (1922–1969), actress, singer (aged 47)
 Tony Gaudio (1883–1951), cinematographer (aged 67)
 Janet Gaynor (1906–1984), actress (aged 77)
 Gidget Gein (1969–2008), musician/bassist for Marilyn Manson (aged 39)
 Carmelita Geraghty (1901–1966), actress, wife of Carey Wilson (aged 65)
 Estelle Getty (1923–2008), actress/comedian (aged 84)
 Maury Gertsman (1907–1999), cinematographer (aged 92)
 Etienne Girardot (1856–1939), actor (aged 83)
 Irving Glassberg (1906–1958), cinematographer and discovered Clint Eastwood (aged 52)
 Jonathan Gold (1960-2018), Pulitzer Prize-winning food critic and music critic (aged 57)
 Rebecca Spikings-Goldsman (1967-2010), film producer and filmmaker (aged 42)
 Steve Golin (1955-2019), producer (aged 64)
 Leo Gordon (1922–2000), actor, husband of Lynn Cartwright (aged 78)
 Vera Gordon (1886–1948), actress (aged 62)
 Archie Gottler (1896–1959), director/screenwriter/composer/actor (aged 63)
 Griffith J. Griffith (1850–1919), park and observatory donor, namesake of Griffith Park (aged 69)
 Bob Guccione (1930–2010), magazine publisher, founder of Penthouse (aged 79)

H

 George Hackathorne (1896–1940), actor (aged 44)
 Joan Hackett (1934–1983), actress (aged 49)
 Bianca Halstead (1965–2001), musician (aged 36)
 Harley Hamilton (1861–1933), musician (aged 72)
 John Hamilton (1887–1958), actor (aged 71)
 Curtis Harrington (1926–2007), director (aged 80)
 Kenneth Harlan (1895–1967), actor (aged 72)
 Valerie Harper (1939–2019), actress (aged 80)
 Mildred Harris (1901–1944), actress (aged 42)
 Don C. Harvey (1911–1963), actor (aged 51)
 Jean Havez (1869–1925), songwriter (aged 55)
 Wanda Hawley (1895–1963), actress (aged 68)
 Lennie Hayton (1908–1971), composer, conductor and arranger (aged 63)
 Lillie Hayward (1891–1977), actress/screenwriter (aged 85)
 Anne Heche (1969–2022), actress (aged 53)
 Pauline Pfeiffer Hemingway (1895–1951), wife of Ernest Hemingway (aged 55)
 Woody Herman (1913–1987), musician, clarinetist (aged 74)
 Benjamin Franklin Hilliker (1843–1916), Medal of Honor recipient (aged 73)
 Darla Hood (1931–1979), actress/singer (aged 47)
 David Horsley (1873–1933), built the first Hollywood movie studio (aged 60)
 Jean Howard (1910–2000), actress/photographer (aged 89)
 Rance Howard (1928–2017), actor, father of Ron Howard (aged 89)
 H. Bruce Humberstone (1901–1984), actor and director (aged 82)
 William J. Hunsaker (1855–1933), politician/attorney (aged 77)
 Marsha Hunt (1917–2022), actress (aged 104)
 John Huston (1906–1987), actor, director/screenwriter (aged 81)
 Halyna Hutchins (1979–2021), cinematographer (aged 42)

I 

 Tonya Ingram  (1991 – 2022), poet, disability advocate (aged 31)

J
 Steve James (1952–1993), actor (aged 41)
 Rick Jason (1923–2000), actor (aged 77)
 Herb Jeffries (1913–2014), singer and actor (aged 100)
 Christopher Jones (1941–2014), actor (aged 72)
 Walter Jurmann (1903–1971), composer (aged 68)
 Fran Jeffries (1937–2016), actress & singer (aged 79)

K
 Olga Kaljakin (1950–2008), film poster designer (aged 57)
 Bronisław Kaper (1902–1983), composer (aged 81)
 Roscoe Karns (1891–1970), actor (aged 78)
 Jenny Twitchell Kempton (1835–1921), singer (aged 85)
 Michael Kidd (1915–2007), choreographer (aged 92)
 May Kitson (1866–1943), actress (aged 70)
 Skelton Knaggs (1911–1955), actor (aged 43)
 Andrew Koenig (1968–2010), actor and filmmaker (aged 41)
 Zoltán Korda (1895–1961), director (aged 66)
 Erich Wolfgang Korngold (1897–1957), composer (aged 60)
 Kathleen Kirkham (1895–1961), actress (aged 66)
 Bob Kulick (1950-2020), rock guitarist (aged 70)

L

 Don LaFontaine (1940–2008), voice-over actor (aged 68)
 Arthur Lake (1905–1987), actor (aged 81)
 Barbara La Marr (1896–1926), actress (aged 29)
 David Lander (1947-2020), actor (aged 73)
 Mark Lanegan (1964-2022), singer (aged 57)
 Jesse L. Lasky (1880–1958), pioneer, founded Famous Players-Lasky, which became Paramount Pictures (aged 77)
 Jesse Lasky, Jr. (1910–1988), screenwriter, son of Jesse Lasky (aged 77)
 Barry Latman (1936–2019), baseball player (aged 82)
 Florence Lawrence (1890–1938), actress (aged 48)
 Lillian Lawrence (1868–1926), actress (aged 58)
 Henry Lehrman (1886–1946), director (aged 60)
 Edward LeSaint (1870–1940), actor (aged 69)
 Cathy Lewis (1916–1968), actress (aged 53)
 Elmo Lincoln (1889–1952), actor (aged 63)
 Perry Lopez (1929–2008), actor (aged 78)
 Peter Lorre (1904–1964), actor (aged 59)
 Ben Lyon (1901–1979), actor (aged 78)

M

 Robert S. MacAlister (1897–1957), Los Angeles City Council member, (1934–39) (aged 60)
 Jeanie MacPherson (1887–1946), actress, screenwriter (aged 59)
 Richard Maibaum (1909–1991), screenwriter (aged 81)
 Leo D. Maloney (1888–1929), pioneer actor/director and producer (aged 41)
 Paul Malvern (1902–1993), stuntman, actor, and producer (aged 90)
 Jayne Mansfield (1933–1967), actress (she has a cenotaph; she is buried in Fairview Cemetery in Pen Argyl, Pennsylvania) (aged 34)
 Paul Marco (1927–2006), actor (aged 78)
 Peverell Marley (1899-1964), cinematographer (aged 64)
 Tully Marshall (1864–1943), actor/producer and director (aged 78)
 Vivian Marshall, (1888–1969), vaudeville performer and silent film actress (aged 81)
 June Mathis (1887-1927), screenwriter (aged 40)
 Hattie McDaniel (1895–1952), actress, (Cenotaph; she is buried in Angelus-Rosedale Cemetery; (aged 57)
 Darren McGavin (1922–2006), actor (aged 83)
 Adolphe Menjou (1890–1963), actor (aged 73)
 Lou Merrill (1912–1963), actor (aged 51)
 Charles B. Middleton (1874–1949), actor (aged 74)
 Laura Spellman-Middleton (1890–1945), actress (aged 55)
 Ken Miles (1918–1966), sports car racing engineer and driver (aged 47)
 Arthur Charles Miller (1895–1970), cinematographer (aged 75)
 Charles Mintz (1889-1939), animation producer, distributor (aged 50)
 Rhea Mitchell (1890–1957), actress (aged 66)
 Robert Mitchell (1912–2009), organist (aged 96)
 Trevor Moore (1980-2021), comedian (41)
 Paul Muni (1895–1967), actor (aged 71)

N
 Dudley Nichols (1895–1960), screenwriter (aged 64)
 Jack Nitzsche (1937–2000), composer (aged 63)
 Maila Nurmi (1922–2008), actress and television host known as Vampira (aged 85)

O
 Donald Allen Oreck (1930–2006), actor (aged 75)
 Harrison Gray Otis (1837–1917), Los Angeles Times publisher (aged 80)
 Frank Overton (1918–1967), actor (aged 49)
 Seena Owen (1894–1966), actress and screenwriter (aged 71)

P

John Paragon (1954-2021) actor, comedian, writer, director (aged 66)
 Art Pepper (1925–1982), musician, saxophonist (aged 56)
 Barbara Pepper (1915–1969), actress (aged 54)
 Joan Perry (1911–1996), actress (aged 85)
 Tomata du Plenty (1948–2000) singer, founder of the punk band, The Screamers (aged 52)
 Ben Pollack (1903–1971), drummer and bandleader (aged 67)
 Guy Bates Post (1875–1968), actor (aged 92)
 Eleanor Powell (1912–1982), actress/dancer (aged 69)
 Tyrone Power (1914–1958), actor (aged 44)
 Marie Prevost (1896–1937), actress (aged 40)
 Madelyn Pugh (1921–2011), co-writer of I Love Lucy (aged 90)

R

 Dee Dee Ramone (Douglas Glenn Colvin) (1952–2002), musician and member of The Ramones (aged 50)
 Johnny Ramone (1948–2004), musician and member of The Ramones (his ashes were retained by his wife and, after her death, they will both be interred in the Ramone statue) (aged 55) 
 Virginia Rappe (1891–1921), actress who died after a party thrown by Roscoe "Fatty" Arbuckle (aged 30)
 Marie Rappold (1879–1957), singer (aged 80)
 Tom Reddin (1916–2004), LAPD police chief (1964–1969) (aged 88)
 Rodd Redwing (1904–1971), actor, world's greatest quick draw artist (aged 66)
 George Regas (1890–1940), actor (aged 50)
 Pedro Regas (1897–1974), actor (aged 77)
 Burt Reynolds (1936–2018), actor and filmmaker (aged 82)
 Tom Ricketts (1853–1939), actor and director (aged 86)
 Nelson Riddle (1921–1985), musician/composer (aged 64)
 Dylan Rieder (1988–2016), professional skateboarder (aged 28)
 Al Ritz (1901–1965), actor/comedian, member of Ritz Brothers (aged 64)
 Harry Ritz (1907–1986), actor/comedian, member of Ritz Brothers (aged 78)
 Jimmy Ritz (1904–1985), actor/comedian, member of Ritz Brothers (aged 81)
 Theodore Roberts (1861–1928), actor (aged 67)
 Edward G. Robinson Jr. (1933–1974), actor, son of Edward G. Robinson (aged 40)
 Mickey Rooney (1920–2014), actor and entertainer (aged 93)
 Arthur Rosson (1886-1960), director (aged 73)
 Harold Rosson (1895–1988), cinematographer (aged 93)
 Richard Rosson (1893-1953), director, actor (aged 60)

S

 Hans J. Salter (1896–1994), composer
 Tom Santschi (1880–1931), actor
 Ann Savage (1921–2008), actress
 Joseph Schildkraut (1896–1964), actor
 Rudolph Schildkraut (1862–1930), actor, father of actor, Joseph Schildkraut
 Leon Schlesinger (1884–1949), head of animation at Warner Bros.
 Herman Schopp (1899–1954), cinematographer
 Tony Scott (1944–2012), producer/director, younger brother of director/producer, Ridley Scott
 Vito Scotti (1918–1996), actor
 Rolfe Sedan (1896–1982), actor
 Moe Sedway (1894–1952), mobster
 Harry Semels (1887–1946), actor
 Almira Sessions (1888–1974), actress
 Dirk Shafer (1962–2015), model and actor
 Peggy Shannon (1907–1941), actress
 Harold M. Shaw (1877–1926), stage and screen actor, director of silent films in the United States, England, and South Africa 
 Barry Shear (1929–1979), producer/director
 Ann Sheridan (1915–1967), actress
 Natasha Shneider (1956–2008), musician, actress
 Bugsy Siegel (1906–1947), gangster (aged 41)
 Jerry Siegel (1914–1996), co-creator of Superman comic books
 Larry Siegel (1925–2019), comedy writer
 Paul Sorvino (1939–2022), actor
 Chief Luther Standing Bear (1868–1939), Sioux Nation actor
 Vsevolod Starosselsky (1875–1953), Russian émigré, former military commander
 Leonid Steele (1921–2014), painter
 Ford Sterling (1883–1939), actor
 Stella Stevens (1938-2023), actress, director, model                                                                                                                                                                          
 Frank R. Strayer (1891–1964), actor, film writer, director, producer
 Yma Sumac (1922–2008), Peruvian singer/actress
 Josef Swickard (1866–1940), actor
 Carl "Alfalfa" Switzer (1927–1959), actor
 Harold Switzer (1925–1967), actor, older brother of Carl Switzer

T
 Constance Talmadge (1898–1973), actress (aged 75)
 Natalie Talmadge (1896–1969), actress (aged 73)
 Norma Talmadge (1894–1957), actress (aged 63)
 Eva Tanguay (1878–1947), singer (aged 71)
 Estelle Taylor (1894–1958), actress (aged 63)
 William Desmond Taylor (1872–1922), director (aged 49)
 Verree Teasdale (1903–1987), actress (aged 83)
 Judy Tenuta (1949–2022), comedian (aged 72)
 Terry (1933–1945), (cenotaph) dog actress, which played Toto in The Wizard of Oz
 Stacy Title (1964–2021), film director (aged 56)
 Charles E. Toberman (1880–1981), builder of the Hollywood Roosevelt Hotel (aged 101)
 Gregg Toland (1904–1948), cinematographer (aged 44)
 Tamara Toumanova (1919–1996), actress (aged 77)
 Noel Toy (1918–2003), actress/dancer, wife of Carleton Young (aged 84)
 Victor Travers (1884–1948), actor (aged 64)
 Al Treloar (1873–1960), bodybuilder and athletic trainer (aged 86)
 Mabel Trunnelle (1879–1981), actress (aged 101)
 John Tyrrell (1900–1949), actor (aged 48)
 James Troesh (1956-2011), quadriplegic actor and screenwriter (aged 54)
 James Michael Tyler (1962-2021), actor (aged 59)

U
 Edgar Ulmer (1904–1972), director (aged 68)

V

 Rudolph Valentino (1895–1926), actor (aged 31)
 James Victor (1939–2016), actor (aged 76)
 Oleg Vidov (1943–2017), actor (aged 73)

W
 George D. Wallace (1917–2005), actor
 Jean Wallace (1923–1990), actress
 Franz Waxman (1906–1967), composer 
 Steve Wayne (1920–2004), actor
 Clifton Webb (1889–1966), actor
 Scott Weiland (1967–2015), musician, lead singer of Stone Temple Pilots (cremated)
 Ern Westmore (1904–1967), make-up artist, member of the Westmore makeup family (aged 62)
 David White (1916–1990), actor
 Marjorie White (1904–1935), actress
 Hobart Johnstone Whitley (1847–1931), Named Hollywood while honeymooning with his wife; gravesite is marked "The Father Of Hollywood" 
 Harvey Henderson Wilcox (1832–1891), founded the city of Hollywood
 Rozz Williams (1963–1998), musician
 Margaret J. Winkler (1895-1990) film executive, animation producer (aged 95)
 Holly Woodlawn (1946–2015), actress, former Warhol superstar, mentioned in Lou Reed's song, "Walk on the Wild Side"
 Fay Wray (1907–2004), actress

Y
 Anton Yelchin (1989–2016), actor (aged 27)
 Duke York (1908–1952), actor (aged 43)
 Francine York (1936–2017), actress (aged 80)
 Victor Young (1899–1956), composer (aged 56)

Z
 Eric Zeisl (1905–1959), composer (aged 54)

References

External links
 Hollywood Forever Cemetery Website
 

 
Hollywood Forever
Hollywood Forever Cemetery